Princess Astrid of Belgium, Archduchess of Austria-Este (born 5 June 1962), is the second child and first daughter of King Albert II and Queen Paola, and the younger sister to the current Belgian monarch, King Philippe. She is married to Prince Lorenz of Belgium, head of the Austria-Este branch of the House of Habsburg-Lorraine, and is fifth in line of succession to the Belgian throne.

Biography
Princess Astrid was born one day before her father's 28th birthday at the Château de Belvédère, near Laeken, and was named after her late paternal grandmother, Astrid of Sweden, the popular first wife of King Leopold III. Her godparents were her uncle Fabrizio, Prince Ruffo di Calabria-Santapau, 7th Duke di Guardia Lombarda, and her aunt Grand Duchess Joséphine-Charlotte of Luxembourg.

Marriage and issue
Princess Astrid married Archduke Lorenz of Austria-Este, subsequently head of the Archducal House of Austria-Este, on 22 September 1984 at Church of Our Blessed Lady of the Sablon in Brussels. Lorenz is the eldest son of Robert, Archduke of Austria-Este (1915–1996), and his wife Princess Margherita of Savoy-Aosta (1930–2022). Her husband was also created Prince of Belgium by Royal Decree on 27 November 1995.

Princess Astrid and Prince Lorenz have five children:
Prince Amedeo Maria Josef Carl Pierre Philippe Paola Marcus d'Aviano of Belgium, Archduke of Austria-Este (born on 21 February 1986 at Cliniques universitaires Saint-Luc in  Woluwé-Saint-Lambert, Brussels).
Princess Maria Laura Zita Beatrix Gerhard of Belgium, Archduchess of Austria-Este (born on 26 August 1988 at Cliniques universitaires Saint-Luc in Woluwé-Saint-Lambert, Brussels), m. William Isvy
Prince Joachim Karl-Maria Nikolaus Isabelle Marcus d'Aviano of Belgium, Archduke of Austria-Este (born on 9 December 1991 at Cliniques universitaires Saint-Luc in  Woluwé-Saint-Lambert, Brussels)
Princess Luisa Maria Anna Martine Pilar of Belgium, Archduchess of Austria-Este (born 11 October 1995 at Clinique St Jean in Woluwé-Saint-Lambert, Brussels)
Princess Laetitia Maria Nora Anna Joachim Zita of Belgium, Archduchess of Austria-Este (born on 23 April 2003 at Clinique St Jean in  Woluwé-Saint-Lambert, Brussels)

Royal role
Astrid was formerly President of the Belgian Red Cross, a position which ended on 31 December 2007. She declined to stand again for election to the role in light of internal struggles in the organisation in reconciling its Flemish-speaking and French branches, each of which seeks greater autonomy. The princess is also a colonel in the Medical Component of the Belgian Armed Forces. Her official residence is the Royal Castle of Laeken on the edge of Brussels.

She is a member of the Honorary Board of the International Paralympic Committee.

In April 2015 the Princess took over the reins of the Prince Albert Fund from her father King Albert.

Special Envoy 
Princess Astrid has been for many years a fierce advocate for landmine survivors rights, participating actively in the work of the Anti-Personnel Mine Ban Convention, also known as the Ottawa Treaty, since Belgium joined in 1998.

In 2013, the Princess was named Special Envoy of the convention, and has promoted the acceptance of a global ban on landmines and promoted the rights of survivors in various UN meetings.

In 2014, she met with Minister of Foreign Affairs Yusuf bin Alawi bin Abdallah, to encourage Oman to join the treaty, which occurred a few months later.

In 2019, she carried out a mission to Lebanon to promote the convention. In Beirut she met with President Michel Aoun, and Minister of National Defense Elias Bou Saab.

Titles, styles and honours

Titles
 5 June 1962 – 22 September 1984: Her Royal Highness Princess Astrid of Belgium
 22 September 1984 – present: Her Imperial and Royal Highness Princess Astrid of Belgium, Archduchess of Austria-Este

Honours

National
 : Grand Cordon of the Order of Leopold

Foreign
 : Grand Cross 1st Class of the Order of Merit of the Federal Republic of Germany
 : Grand Cross of the Order of Merit of the Republic of Hungary
 : Knight Grand Cross of the Order of Adolphe of Nassau
 : Grand Cross of the Order of the Crown
 : Knight Grand Cross of the Order of Merit
 : Grand Cross of the Order of Prince Henry
 : Knight Grand Cross of the Order of Civil Merit
 : Member Grand Cross of the Royal Order of the Polar Star

Awards
 : Freedom of the City of Lima

Other 
2016 : Honorary mayor and The Hidalgo Award of San Antonio, Texas.

Arms

Ranks

Ancestry

Note

References

External links

 Official Belgian Monarchy website – Princess Astrid

Belgian princesses
Belgian expatriates in Switzerland
Members of the Senate (Belgium)
House of Belgium
Austrian princesses
Austria-Este
Nobility from Brussels
1962 births
Living people
Grand Crosses 1st class of the Order of Merit of the Federal Republic of Germany
Grand Crosses of the Order of Merit of the Republic of Hungary (military)
Grand Crosses of the Order of the Crown (Netherlands)
Grand Crosses of the Order of Prince Henry
Grand Cross of the Order of Civil Merit
Commanders Grand Cross of the Order of the Polar Star
Daughters of kings